Jete Nahi Dibo is an Indian Bengali docu-feature directed by Prabir Roy under the banner Royz Media and Entertainment.

Synopsis
The “Docu-Feature” is narrated from Abir (played by Sudip Sarkar) and Ushahi's (played by Swastika Dutta) perspective, who portrays in the film to be very close to Uttam Kumar throughout 70's era until his death. They spent several hours with Uttam Kumar and others associated with the actor's family and friends. The actor's philosophy of life, his acting and struggle is showcased in this docu-feature.

Controversy
The film became controversial during its proposed release. Family members of the actor opposed its release and moved to court. The film received an injunction and was barred from its scheduled release of 22 November 2019.

External links

References 

Bengali-language Indian films
Unreleased Bengali-language films